William Paterson or Bill Paterson may refer to:

People
 Bill Paterson (actor) (born 1945), Scottish actor
 Bill Paterson (footballer, born 1897) (1897–1970), Scottish footballer for Cowdenbeath, Derby, Providence, New Bedford etc
 Bill Paterson (footballer, born 1930) (1930–2002), Scottish footballer for Doncaster, Newcastle, Rangers etc
 William Paterson (actor) (1919–2003), American actor
 William Paterson (Australian politician) (1847–1920), Australian politician
 William Paterson (banker) (1658–1719), Scottish trader, a founder of the Bank of England
 William Paterson (Canadian politician) (1839–1914), Canadian Member of Parliament and Cabinet minister
 William Paterson (explorer) (1755–1810), Scottish soldier, and botanist; former lieutenant governor of Tasmania
 William Paterson (goalkeeper) (1902–?), Scottish footballer for Dunfermline, Dundee United, Arsenal, Airdrieonians etc
 William Paterson (judge) (1745–1806), United States Founding Father, Associate Justice of the U.S. Supreme Court, and signer of the U.S. Constitution
 William Paterson (Michigan politician), Mayor of Flint, Michigan
 William Paterson (trade unionist) (1843–1906), Scottish trade unionist and fire officer
 William Paterson (wrestler), Australian Olympic wrestler
 William A. Paterson (1838–1921), American auto manufacturer and Mayor of Flint, Michigan
 William Alexander Paterson a.k.a. Bill Alexander, (born 1948), American theatre director
 William Burns Paterson (1849–1915), Scottish horticulturist, founder Alabama State University
 William Paterson Paterson (1860–1939), Moderator of the General Assembly of the Church of Scotland in 1919
 William Romaine Paterson, Scottish writer
 William Stanley Bryce Paterson a.k.a. Stan Paterson (1924–2013), glaciologist
 Willie Paterson ( 1913–1928), Scottish footballer for Hamilton, Motherwell, Charlton etc

Other uses
 William Paterson University, Wayne, New Jersey

See also
 William Patterson (disambiguation)
 William Pattison (disambiguation)